Wingz may refer to:

 Informix Wingz, a spreadsheet program
 Wingz (company), an American transportation network company

See also
 Wings (disambiguation)